Santha Rasidpur is a large village located in Mansurchak Block of  Begusarai district in Bihar. Positioned in rural region of Begusarai district of Bihar, it is one among the 38 villages of Mansurchak Block

Geography
The geographical coordinates i.e. latitude and longitude of Santha Rasidpur is 25.6370 and 85.8614 respectively.

References

Villages in Begusarai district